Social Agreement for Greece in Europe, abbreviated as Social Agreement, alternatively translated as Social Pact, is a political party in Greece, established in March 2012.

It was formed by parliamentarians and two former ministers of the Panhellenic Socialist Movement (PASOK) who were expelled from the party after voting against the country's new loan deal with foreign creditors. It is led by Louka Katseli, former Minister for Labour, and Haris Kastanidis, former Minister of the Interior.

In May 2012 elections the party won 60,753 votes (0.96%) and no seats.

In the January 2015 legislative elections, the party joined forces with Syriza.

References

External links
 

2012 establishments in Greece
Political parties established in 2012
Social democratic parties in Greece